The M.Zuiko Digital 17 mm f/1.8 is a prime lens by Olympus Corporation, for the Micro Four Thirds System.  Originally introduced in 2012, the lens features a silent movies and still compatible focusing motor.  The lens, like other Olympus lenses, can switch from auto focus to manual focus by pulling back in its focusing ring.

Reviews

Steve Huff feels that the camera has a "beautiful character" that is neither too sharp nor too smooth. He also feels its out-of-focus areas (its bokeh) is attractive, and that it's a solidly constructed lens. Brendan Nystedt, writing for Reviewed.com, observed that, while sharp in the centers, the corners were not sharp.  He felt the out of focus areas were pleasing but could be better. The Phoblographer, in their review, said that the lens has very fast focus, is a compact and lightweight lens, and has a solid build with the possible exception of its focusing ring. In addition, they said that the image quality was good, but colors lacked punch.

External links
 Official Webpage
 Image Resource review
 Álvaro Serrano's review for Tools and Toys
 ePHOTOzine review by Gary Wolstenholme
 Optical Limits test report and review by Klaus Schroiff
 Robin Wong's review of this lens

References

17mm F1.8
Camera lenses introduced in 2012